Fleta  is a genus of moths of the family Noctuidae.

Species
 Fleta belangeri Guérin-Méneville, 1834
 Fleta moorei Felder, 1874

References
 Fleta at Markku Savela's Lepidoptera and Some Other Life Forms
 Natural History Museum Lepidoptera genus database

Agaristinae